Jean-Claude Dionne (3 January 1935 – 27 June 2021) was a Canadian geographer and geomorphologist. He studied at the Université de Moncton, the Université de Montréal, and Paris Sorbonne University and was a professor emeritus of the Université Laval.

Honors
Médaille André Cailleux (1992)
Prix de l'Association canadienne des géographes (1994)
Special Numéro spécial de la revue Géographie physique et quaternaire (1996)

References

1935 births
2021 deaths
French Quebecers
Université de Moncton alumni
Université de Montréal alumni
Paris-Sorbonne University alumni
Academic staff of Université Laval
People from Bas-Saint-Laurent